Lithosia eburneola is a moth of the subfamily Arctiinae. It was described by Turati in 1933. It is found in the Karakoram Mountains.

References

 Natural History Museum Lepidoptera generic names catalog

Lithosiina
Moths described in 1933